Antonio Muñoz may refer to:

Antonio Muñoz (actor) (born 1966), Guatemalan actor and national motocross champion
 (1884–1960), Italian writer
Antonio Munoz (American politician) (born 1964), Illinois State Senator
Antonio Muñoz (Spanish politician) (born 1959), mayor of Seville
Antonio López Muñoz, 1st Count of López Muñoz, Spanish nobleman, writer and politician
Antonio Marín Muñoz (born 1970), Spanish writer and historian
Antonio Muñoz (tennis) (born 1951), Spanish tennis player
Toni Muñoz (footballer, born 1968) (born 1968), Spanish footballer 
Toni Muñoz (footballer, born 1982), Spanish footballer

See also
Antonio Muñoz Degrain (1840–1924), Spanish painter
Antonio Muñoz Molina (born 1956), writer
Antonio Muñiz (born 1969), abstract surrealist artist